Turbo debesi is a species of sea snail, a marine gastropod mollusk in the family Turbinidae, the turban snails.

Description
The shell grows to a length of 23 mm.

Distribution
This marine species is endemic to Australia and occurs off Western Australia.

References

External links

debesi
Gastropods described in 2000